Litti,  sometimes, along with chokha, is a complete meal that originated from the Bhojpuri region of the Indian states of Bihar and Uttar Pradesh. It is a dough ball made up of whole wheat flour and stuffed with gram flour, pulses and mixed with herbs and spices. It is baked over coal or wood and tossed with large amounts of ghee. Although very often confused with the closely related Rajasthani dish, baati, it is a completely different dish in terms of taste, texture and preparation. It may be eaten with curd, brinjal chokha, potato chokha, and papad. The litti are traditionally baked over a wood fire, but in the modern days, a new fried version has been developed.

Herbs and spices used to flavour the litti include onion, garlic, ginger, coriander leaves, lime juice, carom seeds, nigella seeds and salt. Tasty pickles can also be used to add spice flavour. In western Bihar and eastern Uttar Pradesh litti is served with murgh korma (a creamy chicken curry) or chokha (a vegetable preparation of roasted and mashed eggplant, tomato, and potato).

Detailed ingredients list 

Dough consists of mainly
 atta / wheat flour
 baking powder
 ajwain / carom seeds
 salt
 ghee / clarified butter

Stuffing consists of mainly
 sattu / roasted gram flour
 coriander (finely chopped)
 chilli (finely chopped)
 ginger garlic paste
 jeera / cumin
 kalonji / nigella seeds
 ajwain / carom seeds
 salt
 little bit of lemon juice or dry mango powder
 mustard oil

See also
 Bhojpuri cuisine

References

Bihari cuisine
Indian wheat dishes
Uttar Pradeshi cuisine
Jharkhandi cuisine
Articles containing video clips